Shadowland may refer to:

Music 
Shadowland (band), an early-1990s British progressive rock band
Shadowland (Hula album), 1986
Shadowland (k.d. lang album), 1988
Shadowland (Dark Moor album), 1999
Shadowland (Nocturnal Rites album), 2002
"Shadowland" (song), 2010 song by Jim Kerr
"Shadowland" (The Lion King), song from the musical
"Shadowland", 2003 song by Australian band Youth Group
"Shadowland", song by Casey Stratton
"Shadowland", song by Steve Earle from his 2002 album Jerusalem

Literature 
Shadowland (Cabot novel), 2000 young adult novel by Meg Cabot (as Jenny Carroll)
Shadowland (Straub novel), 1980 horror novel by Peter Straub
Shadowland (Arnold novel), 1978 biographical novel by William Arnold
Shadowland, 2009 novel by Alyson Noël, from her Immortals series
Shadowland, 2009 novel by Chitra Banerjee Divakaruni
Shadowland, 2005 lesbian novel by Radclyffe
Shadowland, alternative name of Mordor, a place in J. R. R. Tolkien's novel The Lord of the Rings

Video games
Shadowland, another name given for the criminal organization Shadaloo, run by video game character M. Bison.

Other 
Shadowland (comics), a 2010 Marvel Comics limited series featuring Daredevil
Shadowland (magazine), a 1919-1923 magazine dedicated to art, dance, and film
Shadowland Theatre,  a community arts theatre and collective of visual and theatre artists on Toronto Island
Shadowland, a variety show by dance theatre Pilobolus
Shadowland, a mini series on Peacock which explores known conspiracy theories that threatens the United States.

See also
 Shadowlands (disambiguation)